Levon Arutyunovich Ishtoyan (born 31 October 1947 in Leninakan, Soviet Union) is a retired Soviet football striker. He emigrated to the United States in the late 1980s and opened a private sportschool in Los Angeles in 2008 called Ishtoyan Soccer Academy.

Honours
 Soviet Top League winner: 1973.
 Soviet Cup winner: 1973, 1975.

International career
Ishtoyan made his debut for USSR on 18 September 1971 in a friendly against India. He played in UEFA Euro 1972 qualifiers, but was not selected for the final tournament squad. He also played in a 1974 FIFA World Cup qualifier against France.

External links
  Official site
  Profile

1947 births
Living people
Footballers from Gyumri
Armenian footballers
Soviet footballers
Soviet emigrants to the United States
Soviet Union international footballers
Soviet Top League players
FC Ararat Yerevan players
American people of Armenian descent
Association football forwards
Soviet Armenians